Svatý Jan is a municipality and village in Příbram District in the Central Bohemian Region of the Czech Republic. It has about 700 inhabitants.

Administrative parts
Villages of Bražná, Brzina, Drážkov, Hojšín, Hrachov, Řadovy and Skrýšov are administrative parts of Svatý Jan.

References

Villages in Příbram District